Georg Hilding Ekelund (18 November 1893, in Kangasniemi – 30 January 1984, in Helsinki) was a Finnish architect, from 1950 to 1958 a professor of housing design at Helsinki University of Technology and from 1931 to 1934 editor-in-chief of the Finnish architects' journal Arkkitehti (Finnish Architectural Review). His career as an architect spans the change in styles in Finland from the Nordic Classicism of the 1920s to the Modernism of the 1970s.

Career
Ekeleund studied architecture at Helsinki University of Technology, qualifying as an architect in 1916. His wide career in architecture spanned from the design of public housing areas and town planning to public buildings, factories and churches. Following a classical education in architecture, where the predominant style was Nordic Classicism, Ekelund like others Finnish architects of his generation, such as Alvar Aalto, made the switch to Modernism – known in Finland as "Functionalism" – partly in response to the greater urbanisation of the country during the 1920s and 1930s.

Ekelund designed a significant number of buildings in the town of Karis, already during the 1930s. The town plan for the town, drawn up in the 1930s by architect Carolus Lindberg was soon regarded as over-dimensioned, and Ekelund was given the task of redesigning it. His "modern" design was influenced by ideas from the Garden city movement, as interpreted in Finland by Otto-Iivari Meurman and its modern interpretation by Le Corbusier, with a particular emphasis on open spaces and parks. In the town Ekelund designed a dispensing chemist, the town hall, cemetery chapel, water tower, trade college and several schools and old-people's homes.

Architectural competitions have been a common method in Finland for choosing designs for key public buildings, and Ekelund entered several of them over the length of his career. For instance, he won the competition for the choice of the site of the Finnish Parliament building - though the final site was later changed and the final architect of the building, following a second competition, was chosen as J.S. Sirén. 
Among Ekelund's more notable buildings are the Taidehalli Art Gallery (together with Jarl Eklund) in Helsinki, Töölö Church in Helsinki, the Finnish Embassy in Moscow, and a number of buildings for the 1952 Summer Olympics held in Helsinki, including the Olympic Rowing Stadium, the Olympic Velodrome, and the Olympic Games village.

Hilding Ekelund's brother was the author and painter Ragnar Ekelund. His wife, Eva Kuhlefelt-Ekelund, was also an architect, and they formed a joint office in 1927.

Major works by Hilding Ekelund 

Kunsthalle Helsinki (1928), Helsinki
Töölö Church (1930), Helsinki
Lutheran Church (1931), Helsinki
 Finnish Embassy in the Soviet Union (1938), Moscow
Olympic Velodrome (1938–40), Helsinki
Olympic Village (1939–40), Helsinki
Helsinki street kiosks (1940s–50s), Helsinki
Karis water tower (1949–1951), Karis
Maunula social housing: terraced housing and apartment blocks (1953), Helsinki
Salmisaari power station (1951), Helsinki
Swedish-speaking Finnish teachers’ house, Roihuvuori (c. 1957), Helsinki
Nelimarkka Museum (1964), Alajärvi
Sahanmäki area regional planning, Maunula, Helsinki

References 
 (In Italian and English)

Notes

External links
 Hilding Ekelund at the Museum of Finnish Architecture

1893 births
1984 deaths
People from Kangasniemi
People from Mikkeli Province (Grand Duchy of Finland)
Finnish architects
Modernist architects
International style architects
Aalto University alumni